Black Aces were a South African football club that played in the Premier Soccer League. Aces usually played their home games in the Mpumalanga province but were based and trained in Johannesburg.

History
The original club was founded in 1937 by dairy workers. The club folded after finishing 14th in the National First Division inland stream in 2002. The club had also been known as Ukhumba Black Aces, Witbank Black Aces and Super Kurl Aces during its existence.

The current club is the second incarnation and they entered the South African football league in 2007 when the Polokwane-based City Pillars league license was bought and the team was transferred to Witbank from Limpopo. The licensed was acquired in December 2006 and the team was playing under the name of Mpumalanga Black Aces in time for the 2007–08 season.

In 2004, two South African businessmen George Morfou and his brother Mario bought the club side Dangerous Darkies, a Vodacom League but the team failed to win promotion to the Mvela Golden League.
The Vodacom League team was renamed to Aces Academy in 2007 following the brothers' acquisition and in 2011 was renamed to AmaZayoni FC.

On July 30, 2014, it was announced that Aces had signed a new sponsorship deal with ISPS.

In 2016, John Comitis purchased the franchise rights, closing the club and creating Cape Town City F.C., over 950 miles away.

Honours
Bob Save Super Bowl winners: 1993
BP Top Eight Cup winners: 1980
PSL promotion/relegation play-off winners: 2008–09, 2012–13

Club records
Most starts: Percy Nxumalo 286
Most goals: Percy Nxumalo 64
Most starts in a season: Joseph Sibiya 41 (1992)
Most goals in a season: Johannes Shili 19 (1992)
Record Victory: 6–0 vs Royal Tigers (20/9/94, League)
Record Defeat: 1–7 vs Hellenic (28/5/97, League)

Premier Soccer League record
 1996–97 – 18th (relegated)
 2009–10 – 15th
 2010–11 – 16th (relegated)
 2013–14 – 7th

Shirt sponsor & kit manufacturer
Shirt sponsor: ISPS Handa
Kit manufacturer: Canterbury
Official Supplier: Chesanyama
Official Car: Ermelo Toyota
Official Accommodation Partner: Tsogo Sun
Luxory Coach Partner: Putco

Managers
 Johnny Ferreira (1993–95)
 Steve Haupt (1997–99)
 Sammy Troughton (November 20, 2008 – November 10, 2009)
 Aiki Agiomamitis (November 11, 2009 – September 21, 2010)
 Neil Tovey (September 30, 2010 – December 23, 2010)
 Paul Dolezar (December, 2010 – February, 2011)
 Mark Harrison (February 23, 2011 – June 27, 2011)
 Craig Rosslee (July, 2011 – November, 2012)
 Rodolfo Zapata (November 2012 – May, 2012)
 Jacob Sakala (June 1, 2012 – June 30, 2013)
 Clive Barker (March 4, 2013 – 2015)
 Jacob Sakala (March, 2014 – May 31, 2015)
 Muhsin Ertuğrul (June, 2015 – 2016)

References

Association football clubs established in 1937
Association football clubs disestablished in 2016
Premier Soccer League clubs
Soccer clubs in Mpumalanga
National First Division clubs
Emalahleni Local Municipality, Mpumalanga